The GiMA Best Music Arranger and Programmer is given by Global Indian Music Academy as a part of its annual Global Indian Music Academy Awards to recognise a music arranger who has delivered an outstanding performance in a film song.

List of winners
 2010 Hitesh Sonik, Clinton Cerejo for "Dhan Te Nan"  – Kaminey
 2011 Sandeep Shirodkar for "Pee Loon"  – Once Upon A Time In Mumbaai
 Abhijit Nalani for "Sheila Ki Jawani" – Tees Maar Khan
 Salim–Sulaiman for "Ainvayi Ainvayi" – Band Baaja Baaraat
 Sandeep Shirodkar for "Tere Mast Mast Do Nain" – Dabangg
 Shankar–Ehsaan–Loy for "Oh Girl You're Mine" – Housefull
 2012 Shankar–Ehsaan–Loy for "Señorita" – Zindagi Na Milegi Dobara
 Abhijit Nalani, Abhijit Vaghani for "Criminal" – Ra.One
 Abhijit Nalani, Giorgio Tuinfort for "Chammak Challo" – Ra.One
 A.R. Rahman for "Sadda Haq" – Rockstar
 Hyacinth D'Souza for "Subha Hone Na De" – Desi Boyz
 Shankar–Ehsaan–Loy for "Zaraa Dil Ko Thaam Lo" – Don 2
 2013 – (no award given)
 2014 Hyacinth D’Souza, DJ Phukan, Nikhil Paul George, Sunny M. R.  for "Badtameez Dil" – Yeh Jawaani Hai Deewani
 DJ Phukan for "Sunn Raha Hai" – Aashiqui 2
 Yo Yo Honey Singh for "Lungi Dance" – Chennai Express
 Shail Hada for "Ram Chahe Leela" – Goliyon Ki Raasleela Ram-Leela
 Gopi Sunder for "1234 Get On The Dance Floor" – Chennai Express
 2015 Amit Trivedi, Sourav Roy for "London Thumakda" – Queen
 A.R. Rahman for "Maahi Ve" – Highway
 Abhijit Nalani, Zoheb Khan for "Bang Bang" – Bang Bang!
 Bharat Goel  for "Baby Doll" – Ragini MMS 2
 DJ Phukan  for "Awari" – Ek Villain
 Shankar–Ehsaan–Loy for "Kill Dil" – Kill Dil
 2016 Shail-Pritesh for "Deewani Mastani" – Bajirao Mastani
 Amit Trivedi, Sovon Mukherjee for "Dhadaam Dhadaam" – Bombay Velvet
 Amit Trivedi, Sourav Roy, Gourab Dutta for "Gulaabo" – Shaandaar
 Kalyan Pathak, Mike Cichowicz for "Girls Like To Swing" – Dil Dhadakne Do
 Sachin–Jigar  for "Jee Karda" – Badlapur

See also
 Bollywood
 Cinema of India

References

Global Indian Music Academy Awards